State Route 88 (SR-88) is a state highway in the U.S. state of Utah, connecting Ouray to US-40/US-191.

Route description

SR-88 begins at the south end of the Green River bridge near Ouray, within the Uintah Basin. It heads northwards, gradually climbing through the valley of that river, passing east of Pelican Lake, and onto a more rugged plateau just beyond the intersection with 4500 South (which carried SR-88 until 1969). The route's north end is at US-40/US-191 on this plateau.

History
The state legislature defined State Route 88 in 1935, connecting Ouray to SR-6 (US-40) at Fort Duchesne. State Route 209 was created in 1941, heading north from SR-88 near Leota to US-40 east of Fort Duchesne. In 1969, SR-88 was realigned to follow SR-209, with the old alignment to Fort Duchesne becoming a county road.

Major intersections

References

External links

088
 088